Laurence Trastour-Isnart (born 6 March 1972) is a French politician representing The Republicans.

Political career

Career in local politics
Trastour-Isnart was elected municipal councilor of Cagnes-sur-Mer, a delegate for early childhood, from 1998 to 2001. From 2001 to 2017, she was deputy mayor. Between 2014 and 2016, she sits in the Nice Côte d'Azur metropolis.

In 2015, Trastour-Isnart was elected regional councilor for the Provence-Alpes-Côte d'Azur region on Christian Estrosi's list. She is vice-chair of the "high school, apprenticeship, vocational training" commission.

Member of the National Assembly
Trastour-Isnart was elected to the French National Assembly on 18 June 2017, representing Alpes-Maritimes's 6th constituency. In parliament, Trastour-Isnart is a member of the Defense Committee.

In addition to her committee assignments, Trastour-Isnart serves as president of the France-Slovenia group  and vice-president of friendship groups with Sweden, Ireland  Peru, Brunei-Malaysia, Kazakhstan  and North Macedonia. She is also secretary of a dozen friendship groups, including the France-Monaco  and France-Finland friendship groups 

In addition, Trastour-Isnart participates in several friendship groups such with Israel, South Korea  or South Africa  She is also part of several international study groups such as the one on relations with the Holy See. or the one on questions related to the expansion of the Taiwanese economy 

Since 2022, Trastour-Isnart has also been a member of the French delegation to the Parliamentary Assembly of the Council of Europe (PACE). In the Assembly, he serves on the Committee on Social Affairs, Health and Sustainable Development.

In the Republicans' 2017 leadership election, Trastour-Isnart endorsed Laurent Wauquiez as chairman.

She lost her seat in the first round of the 2022 French legislative election.

Personal life
Trastour-Isnart is married and has three children

See also
 2017 French legislative election

References

1972 births
Living people
Deputies of the 15th National Assembly of the French Fifth Republic
The Republicans (France) politicians
Place of birth missing (living people)
Women members of the National Assembly (France)
21st-century French women politicians